Victor John Kulbitski (June 15, 1921 – May 23, 1998) was an American football fullback who played two seasons with the Buffalo Bisons/Bills of the All-America Football Conference. He was drafted by the Philadelphia Eagles in the seventh round of the 1944 NFL Draft. He first enrolled at the University of Minnesota before transferring to the University of Notre Dame and later transferring back to the University of Minnesota. Kulbitski attended Red Wing High School in Red Wing, Minnesota.

References

External links
Just Sports Stats

1921 births
1998 deaths
Players of American football from Minnesota
American football fullbacks
Minnesota Golden Gophers football players
Notre Dame Fighting Irish football players
Buffalo Bisons (AAFC) players
Buffalo Bills (AAFC) players
People from Virginia, Minnesota